Dillagi may refer to:
 Dillagi (1942 film), 1942 Indian Hindi-language romance film by  Balwant Bhatt, starring Sushil Kumar and Hansa Wadkar
 Dillagi (1949 film), Indian romantic-drama film by Abdur Rashid Kardar, starring Shyam and Suraiya
 Dillagi (1966 film), Indian romance film by S. N. Banerjee, starring Mala Sinha and Sanjay Khan
 Dillagi (1974 film), Pakistani Urdu-language romantic-drama film by Aslam Dar, starring Shabnam and Nadeem
 Dillagi (1978 film), Indian romance film by Basu Chatterjee, starring Dharmendra and Hema Malini
 Dillagi (1999 film), Indian romance film by Sunny Deol, starring Deol, Bobby Deol and Urmila Matondkar

See also
 "Tumhe Dillagi", a Ghazal Qawwali by Nusrat Fateh Ali Khan
 Dil Lagi, a 2016 Pakistani TV series